HTHS may refer to:

 Haddon Township High School
 Harrison Trimble High School
 High Tech High School (North Bergen, NJ)
 High Technology High School
 High-Temperature High-Shear
 Hinsdale Township High School (disambiguation), multiple schools
 Hum Tumhare Hain Sanam